Backbeat is a 1994 independent drama film directed by Iain Softley. It chronicles the early days of the Beatles in Hamburg, Germany. The film focuses primarily on the relationship between Stuart Sutcliffe (Stephen Dorff) and John Lennon (Ian Hart), and also with Sutcliffe's German girlfriend Astrid Kirchherr (Sheryl Lee). It has subsequently been made into a stage production.

Plot
The film follows the Beatles through their pre-fame Hamburg days when Stuart Sutcliffe, the band's bassist, meets German photographer Astrid Kirchherr.

Cast

In addition, brief portrayals of other historical characters in these early days of the Beatles include Paul Duckworth as Ringo Starr, Paul Humpoletz as Bruno Koschmider, Wolf Kahler as Bert Kaempfert and James Doherty as Tony Sheridan.

Hart had already played Lennon in the 1991 film The Hours and Times.  Bakewell later reprised his role as McCartney in the 2000 television film The Linda McCartney Story.  Williams reprised his role as Best in the 2000 television film In His Life: The John Lennon Story.

Production

Writing
The original script was written by Iain Softley based on a series of 1988 interviews. After failing to secure funding, screenwriter Stephen Ward was brought in to completely rewrite the script in 1993. Ward interviewed Astrid Kirchherr and others who were close to the Beatles during their time in Hamburg. The project was green-lit that year.

Soundtrack

Due to the film's focus on the early days of the band, the soundtrack includes no songs written by members of the Beatles but various songs the group performed in Hamburg, written and recorded by other artists. In this respect, rather than re-create the sounds of the period, iconoclastic, rebellious musicians were recruited (as a producer noted, the Beatles' pre-recording stage act was "the punk of its day") to better convey the way the music was appreciated by audiences of the time. All musicians were members of contemporary American rock bands:
 
 Dave Pirner (Soul Asylum): vocals (Paul McCartney)
 Greg Dulli (The Afghan Whigs): vocals (John Lennon)
 Thurston Moore (Sonic Youth): guitar
 Don Fleming (Gumball): guitar
 Mike Mills (R.E.M.): bass guitar
 Dave Grohl (Nirvana): drums
 Henry Rollins (Black Flag): vocals (Stuart Sutcliffe)

The film's distributor happened to be PolyGram Filmed Entertainment which was then under common ownership with Polydor Records, the label that owned the rights to the Beatles' music from the Hamburg days.

Release
The film premiered on 14 April 1994. It was then given a limited theatrical release. A DVD version was released by Universal  in 2005.

Reception

Critics
Backbeat holds a rating of 68% based on 40 reviews on Rotten Tomatoes, the review aggregator site. The site’s consensus states, "Its overly pretentious and melodramatic leanings notwithstanding, Backbeat explores the beginnings of the Fab Four with striking authenticity, soaring rock 'n' roll verve, and a strong admiration for its subjects."

Peter Travers of Rolling Stone liked how the film captured the early 60s period through its visual style and use of music. Film critic Roger Ebert gave the film two out of four stars; although he thought the "dialogue has real wit", he felt the film is "never able to convince us there's a story there".

The Beatles and others
At the time of the film’s release, Paul McCartney commented:One of my annoyances about the film Backbeat is that they've actually taken my rock 'n' rollness off me. They give John the song "Long Tall Sally" to sing and he never sang it in his life. But now it's set in cement. It's like the Buddy Holly and Glenn Miller stories. The Buddy Holly Story does not even mention Norman Petty, and The Glenn Miller Story is a sugarcoated version of his life. Now Backbeat has done the same thing to the story of the Beatles. I was quite taken, however, with Stephen Dorff's astonishing performance as Stu.

Astrid Kirchherr praised the accuracy and detail of her relationship with Sutcliffe and the Beatles. The film received further positive responses from Julian Lennon, Pete Best, and Sutcliffe's sister, Pauline, who said, "I still think the director did a fabulous job. It's a good movie. If you like movies, it's a great movie."

Stage adaptions
The film's original writer and director, Iain Softley, turned the screenplay of Backbeat into a theatrical production. It premiered at Glasgow's Citizens' Theatre on 9 February 2010 featuring a live band. In 2011 another stage version opened at the Duke of York's Theatre in London.

See also
 Birth of the Beatles, a 1979 biopic covering the early years of the pre-fame Beatles.
 Nowhere Boy, a 2009 biopic focusing on the life of young John Lennon and the formation of The Quarrymen.

References

External links
 
 
 
 

1994 films
1990s biographical drama films
Biographical films about musicians
British biographical drama films
Films about the Beatles
Films adapted into plays
Films set in West Germany
Films set in Hamburg
Films set in Liverpool
Films set in the 1960s
PolyGram Filmed Entertainment films
Gramercy Pictures films
1994 independent films
Films directed by Iain Softley
1994 directorial debut films
1994 drama films
1990s English-language films
Music in Hamburg
1990s British films